Kartal Park is an urban public park in Kartal district of Istanbul, Turkey. It is owned by the Metropolitan Municipality of Istanbul. The park features artificial mist accompanied with colorful light effects and classical music attracting local residents in hot summer days.

Kartal Park is located alongside Turgut Özal Boulevard on the seashore of Sea of Marmara in Kartal district in Istanbul, Turkey. It as developed in two stages by adding a green area of  later to the initial park with  area.

72 palm trees are planted to both sides of the park, and 12 different seasonal flower vegetation decorates the park. Architectural structures of the park are arcades flanking the walk ways and long pools.

Kartal Mist Park
In July 2018, a -covering part of the park was developed into a "mist park". Aerosol sprays around the pools create mist that is accompanied by colorful light effects and classical music. The feature as a mist park, which is unique in the country, attracts local residents and mainly children during the hot summer days.

References

Parks in Istanbul
Urban public parks
Kartal